7,8-Dihydrocannabinol (7,8-DHC) is a trace component of cannabis. Despite its structural similarity to active cannabinoids such as tetrahydrocannabinol and cannabinol, its pharmacology has not been studied.

See also
 8,9-Dihydrocannabidiol
 Delta-3-THC
 Delta-4-THC
 Delta-7-THC
 Delta-8-THC
 Delta-10-THC
 Hexahydrocannabinol

References 

Cannabinoids
Benzochromenes